There are an estimated  of roads and highways across the Canadian territory of Nunavut, which is the only province/territory not connected by road to other parts of Canada.

Most vehicles in the territory are moved from community to community and in and out of the territory by large barges that move during the summer shipping season. Less commonly, vehicles may be flown in on a cargo plane. Car companies will usually fly vehicles in to test them in Arctic conditions.

The few highways that exist in Nunavut are not numbered. Street signs are in English, Inuktitut and Inuinnaqtun depending on locations.
Compared to the rest of Canada, maintaining a vehicle in Nunavut is expensive. Rough roads and harsh weather result in expensive upkeep for vehicles, and despite being subsidised by the government, gas prices are among the highest in Canada. Parts can take an extremely long time to ship in and are very expensive. Mechanics also charge a premium, since very few do business in the territory. Due to the lack of a cohesive road network, aircraft are still the preferred way to travel, especially between communities, along with ATVs through most of the year, snowmobiles in winter, and boats during the summer. Travel by dog sled has largely disappeared, although recreational dog-sledding is still common.

About 4,000 vehicles are registered in the territory. Many makes and models of vehicles can be found in the territory, but the most common are heavy-duty four-wheel-drive vehicles such as sport utility, jeeps and full-size vans. A wide range of vehicles can be found in Iqaluit, where the government tends to do most of its business and the road system consists of paved and chip-sealed portions, although it too is primarily dirt.

Despite Nunavut's isolation from the rest of Canada's road network, provincial licence plates can be found from Newfoundland and Labrador, Quebec, and Northwest Territories, as well as government plates from the Department of National Defence; vehicles of all provincial plates can sometimes be found in the territory. Nunavut, at one time was like the Northwest Territories, in that it was one of the few jurisdictions in the world where non-rectangular licence plates could be found, as these two territories issued plates in the shape of a polar bear; Nunavut no longer issues these.

Vehicles can display their old provincial plates for 90 days before they must be registered in the territory.

A road link to Manitoba was once planned. This road would cost an estimated $1.2 billion to build and another $3 million a year to maintain. This road is expected to run  from Sundance, Manitoba to Rankin Inlet, Nunavut. However, a study showed that the cost of building the road would likely far outweigh any potential economic benefits. A proposal was also in place for a highway to Rankin Inlet, Nunavut from Gillam, Manitoba with a connection to Churchill, Manitoba, a route that was chosen over two other alternatives from Thompson and Lynn Lake.

A road was briefly considered in 2004 for construction between Iqaluit and Kimmirut (formerly known as Lake Harbour), but it would be four times longer than the direct air-distance between the communities, and the idea was dropped.

In 2016, the federal government approved $64 million in funding to build a deepsea port in Iqaluit, expected to be completed in 2020. It would be used to cut costs for goods that would otherwise have to be flown in, and was also envisioned to allow a vehicle ferry service to Happy Valley-Goose Bay in Newfoundland and Labrador. In 2019, it was announced that the port would not include the facilities necessary for the ferry service, as they would have been too expensive.

Important roads and highways in Nunavut

Tibbitt to Contwoyto Winter Road

This private winter road was once a way for trucks to drive to Nunavut from Yellowknife. The private winter road services a number of mines and worker lodgings in the region. The entire road is 605 km (376 mi) and is the world's longest heavy haul ice road. It is open between February and March each year. Since the closure of Lupin Gold Mine and Jericho Diamond Mine, only the first 400 kilometres (250 miles) of the Tibbitt to Contwoyto Winter Road have been constructed each winter. The road does not cross into Nunavut any longer. The public may drive on the first few kilometers of the winter road, but must turn around at a security checkpoint. The road ends at the Ekati Diamond Mine in the Northwest Territories.

Arctic Bay to Nanisivik Highway
This 21 km (13 mi) stretch of Highway connects the town of Arctic Bay to the former mining town of Nanisivik. The road also gained world fame for a number of years when it was used for the Midnight Sun Marathon run but has become less important when the mine shut down in 2002. The mine was later contaminated with lead. However, it should benefit from the Canadian Forces planned $100 million expansion of the Nanisivik deep water port and airport announced on August 10, 2007, by Prime Minister Stephen Harper.

Eureka Highway
This is a 20 km (12 mi) all-weather highway that provides the link from Eureka Weather Station to CFB Eureka and the Eureka Airport.

Federal Road, Iqaluit
The main road in Iqaluit, this road provides access from the Airport to the City Centre and to the Nunavut Legislature Building.

Niaqunngusiariaq Road, Iqaluit
This road provides access from Iqaluit to the original community of Apex (Niaqunguut). The road was built by the United States Army Corps of Engineers in order to keep their soldiers busy while they waited for the sea-ice to open up to let them go home in the summer of 1956.

The bridge across Kujesse (Apex Creek) was a gift from the Government of Ontario's Department of Highways the following year.

The inaugural trip down Apex Hill led to a truckload of soldiers in the ditch. The brakes on the army vehicle had not been tested for several years in the "flats" of what was then Frobisher Bay, and they did not hold when tested on the new road. Only pride was injured when the truck hit the ditch on its first trip.

Prior to the road being built, schoolchildren living near the base at "Ikaluit" walked to Federal Day School in Apex over the sea ice or stayed with relatives in Apex, as the base in Frobisher Bay was "off limits" to Inuit.

Today, this road has been developed along much of its 5 km (3 mi) length. It is now one of the busiest roads in the territory, a typical rush hour sustains 500 cars an hour, although rush hour itself is locally called the "rush minute".

Alert to Alert Airport Road
This roughly 6 km (4 mi) stretch of all-weather road is the most northern stretch of road in the world. This road provides access from Canadian Forces Station Alert to the Alert Airport.

Ovayok Road
Runs from Cambridge Bay eastward 17 km (11 mi) to Ovayok Territorial Park (Mount Pelly). Another road runs west approximately 14 km (9 mi) from the hamlet.

Coral Harbour Airport Road
Connects the hamlet of Coral Harbour on Southampton Island with its airport, 11 km (7 mi) away.

References

External links
Study for proposed Manitoba-Nunavut road
News article on the proposal for the Manitoba-Nunavut road.
Contwoyto Winter Road Facts
News Article on Nunavut Traffic Safety
News article on Newfoundland plates, traffic congestion and traffic statistics in Nunavut
Road to Nowhere rezoning report at Nunastsiaq News

Nunavut
Roads in Nunavut
Lists of buildings and structures in Nunavut